Patufet (also known as Garbancito in Spanish) is the main character of one of the most famous folktales of Catalan tradition. 

It is related to the stories of Tom Thumb, Little Thumb or Thumbling (Catalan: Polzet; Spanish: Pulgarcito).

Description
Patufet is usually represented as a very small child the size of a rice grain or a little garbanzo bean, wearing a big red barretina so that his parents can better spot him around the place. He is curious and mischievous, until one day he decides to show the world that he's useful and reliable. According to some versions Patufet was good-natured and hard-working from the beginning.

The first task he sets about to do is to go to the shop to buy some saffron. Since people can't see him because he's so small, he avoids being trodden on by singing,

The people he meets only see a coin that walks and sings but he manages to accomplish his task. Afterwards he decides to go to the farm fields to take lunch to his father. But Patufet is not lucky: when it starts to rain he takes refuge under a cabbage where he fell asleep; after this he accidentally gets eaten by an ox.

His parents go about looking for him, calling "Patufeeet, on eeets?" (Patufeeet, where are youuu?) and he replies from inside the ox,

After a while they hear Patufet's little voice and his parents feeds the ox with cabbages that make it fart faster.

Influences

This tale can be considered as a coming of age symbol.

En Patufet was also the title of an influential children's magazine in Catalan published from 1904 to 1938, and again from 1968 to 1973. The figure of Patufet on the magazine was first drawn by Antoni Muntanyola.

Today Patufet is a familiar word in Catalan for a very little kid or for a children's publication.

In The Triplets series there was a chapter about "Patufet".

References

Fairy tale stock characters
Catalan folklore
Catalan symbols

es:En Patufet#El cuento popular